C12orf40, also known as Chromosome 12 Open Reading Frame 40, HEL-206, and Epididymis Luminal Protein 206 is a protein that in humans is encoded by the C12orf40 gene.

Gene

Human gene
In humans, the gene for C12orf40 is located on chromosome 12. There are 13 exons in the canonical isoform that is transcribed into an mRNA of 2797 base pairs. Three other isoforms have been isolated.

Evolution
Homologs exist as distant as the green sea turtle and chickens at approximately 60% sequence identity, suggesting that the gene may have arisen in the amniotes after their divergence from other tetrapods; the first 4 exons are conserved with 36% identity as distantly as the anemone.

Protein

Properties

The human C12orf40 protein is 652 amino acids in length. Its molecular weight is predicted to be 74.52 kDa, and its isoelectric point 7.822. Amino acids 229-652 contain a domain of unknown function (DUF4552) which is conserved in vertebrates. C12orf40 is predicted to be a soluble protein with no transmembrane segments. Its secondary and tertiary structures are not currently known.

Interactions 

Experimental evidence shows that C12orf40 has a physical interaction with dynein light chain 2 (DYNLL2). This protein is part of a complex that regulates the function of the motor protein dynein.

Expression
Within the cell, C12orf40 is predicted to be present in the nucleus based on signals within its sequence. An analysis of normal human tissues shows that C12orf40 expression occurs primarily in the testis, suggesting importance to the male reproductive system.

Clinical significance
The function of C12orf40 is not yet well understood. However, the three prime untranslated region (3' UTR) of C12orf40 is highly similar to the 3' UTR of the cystic fibrosis transmembrane conductance regulator (CFTR), which may mean that the two genes share certain expression patterns. In the fibroblasts of hypertrophic scars, exposure to the immunosuppressant Tacrolimus causes C12orf40 up-regulation.  In pigs, a region homologous to human C12orf40 plays a role in arthrogryposis, a disease characterized by congenital fibrosis. The common thread of these studies suggests that C12orf40 may have a connection to the formation of healthy connective tissue.

References 

Chromosomes
Protein families